The Heinrich Wieland Prize is awarded annually by the Boehringer Ingelheim Foundation for outstanding research on biologically active molecules and systems in the areas of chemistry, biochemistry and physiology as well as their clinical importance.

In 1963, the Margarine Institute established the Heinrich Wieland Prize to support research in the field of lipids. In 2000, the Margarine Institute ended its sponsorship of the Prize and the pharmaceutical company Boehringer Ingelheim became the new sponsor. In 2011, the Boehringer Ingelheim Foundation took over the prize.

The awardee is selected by a scientific board of trustees. The prize is named after the Nobel Prize Laureate in chemistry Professor Heinrich Wieland (1877-1957), one of the leading lipid chemists of the first half of the 20th century. To mark its 50th anniversary in 2014, the prize money was raised to 100,000 euros.

Four of its awardees have gone on to receive the Nobel Prize: Michael S. Brown and Joseph L. Goldstein (1974), Bengt Samuelsson (1981) and James E. Rothman 1990.

Prize winners
Source:  Boehringer Ingelheim Foundation Heinrich Wieland Prize Laureates since 2020

1964: Ernst Klenk
1965: Wilhelm Stoffel
1966: no award presented
1967: Heinrich Wagener and Bruno Frosch
1968: David Adriaan van Dorp
1969: Werner Seubert
1970: Christian Bode and Harald Goebell
1971: Laurens L.M. van Deenen
1972: Heiner Greten and Kurt Oette
1973: Shosaku Numa
1974: Michael S. Brown and Joseph L. Goldstein
1975: Ernst Ferber and Klaus Resch
1976: Dietrich Seidel and Eckhart Schweizer
1977: Gerd Assmann and Helmut K. Mangold
1978: Olga Stein and Yechezkiel Stein
1979: Konrad Sandhoff
1980: H. Bryan Brewer and Barry Lewis
1981: Bengt Samuelsson
1982: Hansjörg Eibl and Robert William Mahley
1983: John M. Dietschy
1984: Olaf Adam and Gerhart Kurz
1985: Guy Ourisson
1986: Eugene P. Kennedy
1987: Akira Endo and Dietrich Keppler
1988: Lawrence C.B. Chan
1989: Ching-Hsien Huang
1990: James E. Rothman and Karel W. A. Wirtz
1991: Jan L. Breslow
1991: Wolfgang J. Schneider
1992: Lev D. Bergelson
1993: Walter Neupert
1994: Joachim Seelig
1995: Jean E. Schaffer and Dennis E. Vance
1996: Jeffrey M. Friedman
1997: Bruce M. Spiegelman
1998: Thomas E. Willnow
1999: Ernst Heinz
2000: Lewis Clayton Cantley
2001: Felix Wieland
2002: Stephen O'Rahilly
2003: David J. Mangelsdorf
2004: Raphael Mechoulam and Roger Nicoll
2005: Helen Hobbs
2006: Alois Fürstner
2007: Joachim Herz
2008: Markus Stoffel 
2009: Steven Ley
2010: Nenad Ban
2011: Franz-Ulrich Hartl
2012: Carolyn R. Bertozzi
2013: Tony Kouzarides
2014: Reinhard Jahn
2015: Gero Miesenböck
2016: Peter G. Schultz
2017: Alexander Varshavsky
2018: Pascale Cossart
2019: 
2020: Craig M. Crews
2021: Thomas Boehm
2022: Xiaowei Zhuang

See also

 List of chemistry awards
 List of prizes named after people

References

External links
http://www.heinrich-wieland-prize.com

Boehringer Ingelheim
Chemistry awards
American science and technology awards
Awards established in 1963